Crew Dragon Demo-2 (officially Crew Demo-2, SpaceX Demo-2, or Demonstration Mission-2) was the first crewed test flight of the Crew Dragon spacecraft. The spacecraft, named Endeavour, launched on 30 May 2020 on a Falcon 9 booster, and carried NASA astronauts Douglas Hurley and Robert Behnken to the International Space Station in the first crewed orbital spaceflight launched from the United States since the final Space Shuttle mission in 2011, and the first ever operated by a commercial provider. Demo-2 was also the first two-person orbital spaceflight launched from the United States since STS-4 in 1982. Demo-2 completed the validation of crewed spaceflight operations using SpaceX hardware and received human-rating certification for the spacecraft, including astronaut testing of Crew Dragon capabilities on orbit.

Docking was autonomously controlled by the Crew Dragon, but monitored by the flight crew in case manual intervention became necessary. The spacecraft soft docked with the International Space Station on 31 May 2020, nineteen hours after launch. Following soft capture, 12 hooks were closed to complete a hard capture 11 minutes later. Hurley and Behnken worked alongside the crew of Expedition 63 for 62 days, including four spacewalks by Behnken with fellow American astronaut Chris Cassidy to replace batteries brought up by a Japanese cargo vehicle. Endeavour autonomously undocked from the station on 1 August 2020 and thirteen hours later returned the astronauts to Earth in the first water landing by astronauts since 1975.

Background 
After the Space Shuttle program was brought to an end in 2011, NASA no longer had a spacecraft system capable of sending humans to space. As a result, it was forced to fly its astronauts to the International Space Station (ISS) aboard the Russian Soyuz space vehicle, at a cost of up to US$80 million per astronaut. As an alternative, NASA contracted with private companies such as SpaceX for the Commercial Crew Program, which is expected to cost 50% less than Soyuz once in regular operation. Up to the launch, NASA has awarded a total of US$3.1 billion for the development of the Dragon 2. The Demo-2 mission was expected to be SpaceX's last major test before NASA certified it for regular crewed spaceflights. Prior to that, SpaceX had sent twenty cargo missions to the ISS, but never a crewed one. Other than SpaceX, Boeing is also working on crewed orbital spaceflight under the same NASA effort.

Crew 
Douglas Hurley and Robert Behnken were announced as the primary crew on 3 August 2018. Both astronauts are veterans of the Space Shuttle program, and the Demo-2 flight was the third trip to space for both of them. The lead flight director for this mission was Zebulon Scoville.

NASA astronaut Kjell Lindgren was the sole backup crew member for the flight, backing up both Hurley and Behnken for the mission.

Insignia and livery 
The mission insignia was designed by artist Andrew Nyberg from Brainerd, Minnesota, a nephew of spacecraft commander Hurley. The insignia features the logos of the Commercial Crew Program, Falcon 9, Crew Dragon, and the red chevron of NASA's "meatball" insignia. Also depicted are the American flag and a graphic representation of the ISS. The words NASA, SPACEX, FIRST CREWED FLIGHT and DM-2 are printed around the border along with the surnames of the astronauts. The insignia outline is in the shape of the Crew Dragon capsule.

The Falcon 9 rocket used to launch Endeavour displayed NASA's "worm" insignia, the first time the logo had been used officially since it was retired in 1992. NASA TV and media coverage of the launch was branded as "Launch America", with its own logo.

The SpaceX patch shows the top of the company's spacesuit, with the ISS and North America portrayed on the helmet shield and a white star denoting the launch site at Cape Canaveral. Behind the suit are the American flag, and around the insignia's black border SPACEX DRAGON and NASA DEMO-2 are written in white, alongside the names of the two astronauts at the bottom; with a cloverleaf between the two names.

Pre-launch processing 

NASA calculated the loss-of-crew (LOC) probability for the test flight as 1-in-276, better than the commercial crew program requirement threshold of 1-in-270. The 1-in-276 number included mitigations to reduce the risk, such as on-orbit inspections of the Crew Dragon spacecraft once it was docked to the space station to look for damage from micrometeoroids and orbital debris (MMOD). NASA pegged the overall risk of a loss of mission (LOM) as 1-in-60, covering scenarios where the Crew Dragon does not reach the space station as planned, but the crew safely returns to Earth.

The Crew Dragon Demo-2 mission was initially planned for launch in July 2019 as part of the Commercial Crew Program contract with a crew of two on a 14-day test mission to the ISS. The Crew Dragon capsule from the Crew Dragon Demo-1 mission was destroyed while its SuperDraco thrusters were undergoing static fire testing on 20 April 2019, ahead of its planned use for the in-flight abort test. SpaceX traced the cause of the anomaly to a component that leaked oxidizer into the high-pressure helium lines, which then solidified and damaged a valve. The valves were since switched for burst discs to prevent another anomaly. On 19 January 2020, a Crew Dragon capsule successfully completed an in-flight abort test. NASA Administrator Jim Bridenstine said on 9 April 2020 that he was "fairly confident" that astronauts could fly to the ISS aboard SpaceX's Crew Dragon spaceship at the end of May or in early June 2020, pending final parachute tests, data reviews and a training schedule that could escape major impacts from the ongoing COVID-19 pandemic.

On 17 April 2020, NASA and SpaceX announced the launch date as 27 May 2020. The arrival of the Crew Dragon will have raised the station's crew size from three to five. Bob Behnken and Doug Hurley will have performed duties and conducted experiments as crew on board the ISS for several months. Hurley and Behnken were expected to live and work aboard the space station for two or three months, and then return to Earth for a splashdown in the Atlantic Ocean east of Cape Canaveral. NASA Administrator Jim Bridenstine urged space enthusiasts not to travel to the Kennedy Space Center to view the launch and asked people to instead watch the launch on television or online. Bridenstine explained that maintenance crews were working in cohesive shifts, to mitigate workers' exposure to SARS-CoV-2. On 1 May 2020, SpaceX successfully demonstrated the Mark 3 parachute system, a critical milestone for the mission approval. Crew Dragon Demo-2 marked the first crewed United States spaceflight mission not to include the presence of the public at the Kennedy Space Center Visitor Complex due to the COVID-19 pandemic. As the mission was previously delayed, the Visitor Complex opened as of 28 May 2020 with limited capacity for publicly viewing the launch. Admissions sold out almost immediately. To engage the public, notably the Class of 2020, who were unable to attend their graduations due to the COVID-19 pandemic, both NASA and SpaceX invited students and graduates to submit their photos to be flown to the ISS.

Behnken and Hurley arrived at Kennedy Space Center on 20 May 2020 in preparation for the launch. On 21 May 2020, the Falcon 9 rocket was rolled out to the launch pad, and a static fire test was conducted on 22 May 2020, a major milestone ahead of the launch. The mission used a Tesla Model X to transport Hurley and Behnken to LC-39A.

Launch attempts 
An official launch weather forecast for Dragon Crew Demo-2 by the 45th Weather Squadron of the U.S. Space Force, for the original launch time at 20:33:33 UTC on 27 May 2020, predicted a 50% probability of favorable conditions. The launch was scrubbed at T−16:53 minutes due to thunderstorms and light rain in the area caused by Tropical Storm Bertha. The second launch attempt also faced a 50% probability of favorable conditions, but was successful and took place on 30 May 2020 at 19:22:45 UTC. The other launch windows were 31 May 2020 at 19:00:07 UTC, with a 60% probability of favorable conditions and 2 June 2020 at 18:13 UTC with a 70% probability of favorable conditions.

Mission

Launch and orbit 

Three days after the first launch attempt was scrubbed, the Crew Dragon Endeavour launched atop a Falcon 9 rocket from Kennedy Space Center Launch Complex 39A at 19:22:45 UTC on 30 May 2020. The first stage booster (serial number B1058) landed autonomously on the floating barge Of Course I Still Love You, which was prepositioned in the Atlantic Ocean. President Donald Trump and Vice President Mike Pence, with their wives, were at Kennedy Space Center in Florida to see the launch attempt on 27 May 2020, and returned for launch on 30 May 2020. The launch live stream was watched online by 3 million people on NASA feeds, and the SpaceX feed peaked at 4.1 million viewers. NASA estimated roughly 10 million people watched on various online platforms, approximately 150,000 people gathered on Florida's space coast in addition to an unknown number watching on television.

Doug Hurley and Bob Behnken revealed the name of their Crew Dragon capsule 206, Endeavour, shortly after launch, reviving another old tradition from the Mercury, Gemini, and Apollo programs where astronauts would name their spacecraft. It was the third U.S. spacecraft named Endeavour, after , built in 1991 to replace , which was destroyed in 1986, and the Apollo command and service module used for the Apollo 15 mission in 1971. Hurley said that they chose Endeavour as both his and Behnken's first flights to space were on the Shuttle Endeavour.

Each crew member brought along a toy from their family; an Apatosaurus dinosaur named "Tremor" and a Ty plush toy. As in past space missions, the plush toy was used as an indication of zero gravity for the strapped-in astronauts. Behnken and Hurley said, "That was a super cool thing for us to get a chance to do for both of our sons who I hope are super excited to see their toys floating around with us on board".

The crew were awakened on the second day of the flight with Black Sabbath's "Planet Caravan". NASA began a tradition of playing music to astronauts during the Gemini program, and first used music to wake up a flight crew during Apollo 15. Each track is specially chosen, often by the astronauts' families, and usually has a special meaning to an individual member of the crew, or is applicable to their daily activities.

Approach, docking, and activities aboard the ISS 
Nineteen hours later, Endeavour approached the ISS. Following soft capture, 12 hooks were closed to complete a hard capture at 14:27 UTC. Approximately two hours after docking, the last of three hatches between Endeavour and ISS was opened and Hurley and Behnken boarded the ISS at 17:22 UTC, welcomed by and joining the ISS Expedition 63 crew, consisting of NASA astronaut Christopher "Chris" Cassidy and Russian cosmonauts Anatoly Ivanishin and Ivan Vagner.

Over their time aboard the ISS, Hurley and Behnken spent over 100 hours completing science experiments, while traveling 27 million miles over their 1024 orbits of the Earth. Behnken also completed 4 spacewalks with Chris Cassidy.

Undocking and return 
NASA mission managers had evaluated additional sites off Panama City, Florida, Tallahassee, Tampa, and Daytona Beach to provide more options in the event of stormy tropical weather. The United States Coast Guard advised against entering a  square defined in its Notices to Mariners for the hours leading up to splashdown noting "hazardous space operations" and the Federal Aviation Administration (FAA) restricted air traffic in the area in a NOTAM.

Endeavour stayed docked to the ISS for 62 days, 9 hours and 8 minutes, undocking at 23:35 UTC on 1 August 2020. The capsule completed four departure burns to move away from the ISS, followed by a phasing burn lasting over six minutes to place the capsule on a trajectory to return to Earth. The crew was awakened on the final day of the flight with prerecorded voice messages from their sons. A yaw maneuver occurred at 17:51 to separate the "claw" umbilical mechanism from the trunk.

The deorbit burn of 11 minutes and 22 seconds occurred shortly after 17:56 UTC. Just before reentry at 18:11 UTC, the nose cone was closed. Drogue chutes deployed at 18:44 UTC for approximately one minute, drawing out main parachute deployment approximately one minute later. A maximum of 4 g was experienced by Dragon capsule and its crew during the re-entry period.

Sixty-three days, 23 hours, 25 minutes and 21 seconds after launch, at 18:48:06 UTC on 2 August 2020, Endeavour splashed down off the coast of Pensacola, Florida, marking the first splashdown in 45 years for NASA astronauts since the Apollo–Soyuz Test Project, as well as the first splashdown of a crewed spacecraft in the Gulf of Mexico. After splashdown, a crew in one fast boat approached the capsule, checking the air quality for any traces of highly toxic hypergolic propellant which could indicate a leak, while a crew in another fast boat collected the four parachutes which had disconnected from the capsule. While crews worked, many private boats entered the hazardous area defined by the Coast Guard despite earlier warnings. Some moving close to the capsule even passing between the capsule placing themselves and recovery crews themselves in danger. After radioed warnings, the boats dispersed to form a more distant ring around the capsule. The United States Coast Guard said in a statement later that evening that previous warnings were advisory in nature; the three patrol boats in the area were stationed within their jurisdiction and did not provide sufficient resources to board vessels interfering with the recovery. The statement added that they would be reviewing events with NASA and SpaceX. Later SpaceX and NASA confirmed that their next mission will have a  enforceable keep-out zone patrolled by the U.S. Coast Guard. There will be more boats to assist in enforcing the keep-out zone.

The GO Navigator ship, with the assistance of a fast boat crew, attached to the capsule using a retracting A-frame device over the back to place the capsule on the "nest". The "nest" was then pulled further on board the ship where a 30-minute purge of the service section took place, as there were abnormally high levels of dinitrogen tetroxide detected around the capsule. Douglas Hurley and Robert Behnken were then greeted by crew aboard GO Navigator and were subsequently helped out of the capsule and onto stretchers where they were taken into the onboard medical facility, before taking a helicopter back to land.

Post-flight analysis of the Dragon's heat shield revealed higher than expected erosion, at four points where the capsule bolts to the trunk of the vehicle using tension ties. SpaceX stated that the erosion was likely caused by air flow phenomena that were not expected to occur around the ties. The heat shield design was changed to include more erosion resistant materials at the ties. One of four ties was noted to have deep erosion. Though it could not be determined why this was not seen during SpaceX Demo-1, Hans Koenigsmann speculated that it may be related to different mass and trajectory flown by the spacecraft. In addition, SpaceX noted that the parachutes were deployed lower than expected, but still within the allowable range. To address the issue, the instrument used to measure barometric pressure which determines altitude was replaced.

Timeline 
Note: all times in UTC
 T+00:00:00 (19:22:45, 30 May 2020) – the Crew Dragon spacecraft launches from Launch Complex 39A at Cape Canaveral, Florida.
 T+00:01:01 (19:23:46) – Max-Q
 T+00:02:38 (19:25:23) – MECO
 T+00:02:40 (19:25:25) – Stage separation of the Falcon 9.
 T+00:08:50 (19:31:35) – SECO
 T+00:12:08 (19:34:53) – Endeavour separates from the second stage.
 T+17:54 (13:56, 31 May 2020) – Crew Dragon reaches Waypoint 1 for docking with the ISS.
 T+18:54 (14:16) – Initial soft docking with the ISS.
 T+19:05 (14:27) – Hard docking with the ISS.
 T+21:39 (17:01) – Hatch opening.
 T+21:59 (17:22) – Behnken and Hurley board the ISS.
 T+27 days (26 June 2020) – First spacewalk.
 T+32 days (1 July 2020) – Second spacewalk.
 T+47 days (16 July 2020) – Third spacewalk.
 T+52 days (21 July 2020) – Fourth spacewalk.
 T+63 days, 09:08 (23:35, 1 August 2020) – Undocking from ISS.
 T+63 days, 23:25:21 (18:48:06, 2 August 2020) – Capsule return to Earth, splashdown, mission ends.
 T+64 days, 00:36 (19:59, 2 August 2020) – Crew recovery by GO Navigator.

Follow up mission of the capsule 
Endeavour was refurbished and reused for the SpaceX Crew-2 mission that launched on 23 April 2021. Alongside, Bob's seat of the Crew Dragon Endeavor is used by his wife, K. Megan McArthur in Crew-2 mission. The intervening Crew Dragon mission, SpaceX Crew-1 SpaceX's first operational astronaut flight launched four Expedition 64 astronauts aboard Crew Dragon Resilience on 16 November 2020 at 00:27:17 UTC.

See also 

 Boeing Crewed Flight Test, Boeing's first crewed mission of its capsule
 
 List of Falcon 9 and Falcon Heavy launches
 Return to Space - Netflix documentary about SpaceX and Demo-2 mission

Notes

References

External links 

  on NASA TV

Extended video series from SpaceX

Launch, coast, approach, and docking

Departure, return coast, and splashdown 
 
 
 

2020 in the United States
SpaceX Dragon 2
Spacecraft launched in 2020
SpaceX human spaceflights
SpaceX payloads contracted by NASA
Test spaceflights
Launch America
Spacecraft which reentered in 2020